College Holiday is a 1936 Paramount comedy. The film stars Jack Benny, George Burns, Gracie Allen, and Martha Raye. It was directed by Frank Tuttle.

Plot
A woman hotelier with an interest in eugenics invites some young men to spend the summer.

Cast
 Jack Benny as J. Davis Bowster
 George Burns as George Hymen
 Gracie Allen as Calliope 'Gracie' Dove
 Mary Boland as Carola P. Gaye
 Martha Raye as Daisy Schloggenheimer
 Ben Blue as Stage Hand
 Marsha Hunt as Sylvia Smith
 Leif Erickson as Dick Winters
 Eleanore Whitney as Eleanore Wayne
 Johnny Downs as Johnny Jones
 Ellen Drew as Dancer on Train

External links 

1936 films
1930s English-language films
Paramount Pictures films
Films directed by Frank Tuttle
American black-and-white films
1936 comedy films
American comedy films
1930s American films